Te Puke is a  high group of basaltic scoria cones, in the Kaikohe-Bay of Islands volcanic field in Northland, New Zealand. It is the easternmost volcano of the field, being located near Waitangi. The three or four small, cratered cones are in a southwest–northeast alignment. The last eruption was 1300 to 1800 years ago.

References

Geological Society of New Zealand

External links
 View of Te Puke volcano's southernmost crater.
View of crater adjacent to the southern crater.

Volcanoes of the Northland Region
Far North District
Bay of Islands